The Journal of Economic History is an academic journal of economic history which has been published since 1941. Many of its articles are  quantitative, often following the formal approaches that have been called cliometrics or the new economic history to make statistical estimates.

The journal is published on behalf of the Economic History Association by Cambridge University Press. Its editors are Ann Carlos at the University of Colorado and William Collins at Vanderbilt University. Its 2016 impact factor is 1.101.

References

External links 
 

Economics journals
Economic history journals
English-language journals
Publications established in 1941
Quarterly journals
Cambridge University Press academic journals
Academic journals associated with learned and professional societies